William Harrison Gunn (July 15, 1934 – April 5, 1989) was an American playwright, novelist, actor and film director. His 1973 cult classic horror film Ganja and Hess was chosen as one of ten best American films of the decade at the Cannes Film Festival, 1973. In The New Yorker, film critic Richard Brody described him as being "a visionary filmmaker left on the sidelines of the most ostensibly liberated period of American filmmaking." Filmmaker Spike Lee had said that Gunn is "one of the most under-appreciated filmmakers of his time."
Gunn's drama Johnnas won an Emmy Award in 1972.

Career
A native of Philadelphia, Gunn wrote more than 29 plays during his lifetime. He also authored two novels and wrote several produced screenplays. In 1950, Gunn studied acting with Mira Rostova in New York's East Village. In 1954, he played a role in the Broadway production of The Immoralist with James Dean. Along with Dean, he joined a social circle that included Montgomery Clift, Eartha Kitt, and Marlon Brando. Gunn shared a house in Nyack, New York with Sam Waymon, brother of singer Nina Simone, who also wrote the musical score for Ganja and Hess. Gunn's directorial debut would have been Stop! (1970), which was funded by Warner Bros. under the plan of being the second studio film directed by an African American. It was intended as a drama involving two couples becoming involved with each other within homosexual and interracial sexual contact alongside surreal undertones. The film was shelved by the studio before release, and the studio later claimed they did not have the print in their archives. A 35mm print was shown at a retrospective upon Gunn's death, and a VHS copy of the film exists (found by Jack Hoffmeister, co-star of the film). He was also an advocate and friend of filmmaker and writer Kathleen Collins, playing a role in her film Losing Ground.  He died aged 54 from encephalitis at a Nyack, New York hospital the day before his play The Forbidden City opened at the Public Theater in New York City.

In 2021, an exhibition entitled "Till They Listen: Bill Gunn Directs America", dedicated to the work and legacy of Bill Gunn, was shown at the New York gallery Artists Space. The program series was organized by Gunn's artistic collaborators and scholars including, Hilton Als, Jake Perlin, Sam Waymon, Nicholas Forster, Awoye Timpo, Chiz Schultz, and Ishmael Reed. In 2021, Timpo adapted Gunn's play Black Picture Show for film in the form of a staged reading.

Bibliography

Plays
 Marcus in the High Grass (1959) – produced by Theatre Guild.
 Johnnas (1968) – produced in New York City at Chelsea Theatre.
 Black Picture Show (1975) – produced in New York City at Vivian Beaumont Theater.
 Rhinestone (musical; based on novel Rhinestone Sharecropping) (1982) – produced in New York City at Richard Allen Center.
 The Forbidden City (1989) – produced in New York City at The Public Theater.

Screenplays
 Stop (1969), Warner.  (never released)
 (With Ronald Ribman) The Angel Levine (1970) (adaptation of novel by Bernard Malamud), United Artists.
 The Landlord (1970) (adaptation of novel by Kristin Hunter), United Artists.
 Ganja and Hess (1973), Kelly-Jordan Enterprises, re-edited and released under title Blood Couple, Heritage Enterprises.
 The Greatest (1977), Columbia. (uncredited)

Television screenplays
 Johnnas (1972), National Broadcasting Company (NBC).
 The Alberta Hunter Story (1982), co-writer w. Chris Albertson-never completed – Southern Pictures (UK).

Novels
 All the Rest Have Died (1964), Delacorte (New York).
 Rhinestone Sharecropping (1981), Reed, Cannon, .

Filmography (as director)

Filmography (as actor)

References

Further reading
Anderson, Melissa. "In Two Urgent Reprints, Bill Gunn Fights for His Singularity", Village Voice, December 29, 2015.
David, Marlo D. "'Let It Go Black': Desire and the Erotic Subject in the Films of Bill Gunn", Black Camera 2.2 (2011): 26–46.
"Gunn, Bill." Mitchell, Verner D, and Cynthia Davis, eds. Encyclopedia of the Black Arts Movement. Lanham: Rowman & Littlefield, 2019. p. 147-148.
Ostrom, Hans. "Bill Gunn", in Hans Ostrom and J. David Macey (eds), The Greenwood Encyclopedia of African American Literature, Westport, Connecticut: Greenwood Publishers, 2005. Volume II, 683.
Tate, Greg. "Bill Gunn, 1934–89." Village Voice, April 25, 1989. Vol. 34, Iss. 17, p. 98.
Williams, John. "Bill Gunn (1929–1989): A Checklist of His Films, Dramatic Works and Novels." Black American Literature Forum. 25.4 (1991): 781- (7p).

External links

 Bill Gunn Papers – Schomburg Center for Research in Black Culture, Manuscripts, Archives and Rare Books Division
 Original print donated to the collection of the Museum of Modern Art, New York.

1934 births
1989 deaths
African-American male actors
African-American film directors
American experimental filmmakers
American film directors
African-American dramatists and playwrights
Writers from Philadelphia
20th-century American male actors
20th-century American dramatists and playwrights
American male dramatists and playwrights
20th-century American male writers
20th-century African-American writers
African-American male writers